Mónika Király (born 10 November 1983) is a Hungarian road cyclist, who is currently suspended from the sport after a positive doping test for recombinant human erythropoietin (rhEPO). She represented her nation at four UCI Road World Championships between 2004 and 2018.

Major results
Source: 

2013
 1st  Time trial, National Road Championships
2015
 National Road Championships
2nd Road race
3rd Time trial
2016
 National Road Championships
1st  Road race
1st  Time trial
2017
 National Road Championships
1st  Road race
1st  Time trial
 5th Overall Giro della Toscana Int. Femminile – Memorial Michela Fanini
 7th Giro del Trentino Alto Adige-Südtirol
2018
 National Road Championships
2nd Road race
2nd Time trial
2019
 10th Restart Zalaegerszeg, V4 Ladies Series

References

External links
 

Hungarian female cyclists
Living people
People from Mosonmagyaróvár
1983 births
Cyclists at the 2015 European Games
European Games competitors for Hungary
Sportspeople from Győr-Moson-Sopron County